Jackson C. Gott (1829–1909) was an American architect.  Gott was born in Baltimore County, practiced in and around Baltimore all his life, and was named a Fellow of the American Institute of Architects in 1889.

Work 

Buildings designed by him which survive and are listed on the National Register of Historic Places include:

 Johnson Building, 26-30 S. Howard St., Baltimore, 1880
 Rombro Building, 22–24 S. Howard St., Baltimore, 1881
 Governor John Walter Smith House, 104 S. Church St., Snow Hill, Maryland, 1890
 main building of the Hendler Creamery, 1100 E Baltimore St & 1107 E Fayette St., Baltimore, 1892
 Renaissance Building, formerly the Masonic Temple, 101-107 W. Broad Street, Richmond, Virginia, constructed 1888-1893
 Southern District Police Station, 28 E. Ostend St., Baltimore, 1896
 One or more buildings in Union Bridge Historic District, Roughly bounded by Bellevue, E. Locust, Buttersburg Alley, Church, Whyte, W. Locust and the Western Maryland RR tracks, Union Bridge, MD
 One or more buildings in Federal Hill South Historic District, Roughly bounded by Cross St., Olive St., Marshall St., Ostend St., Fort Ave. and Covington St., Baltimore

Gott's work not on the National Register includes:

  the Charles Theatre, Baltimore, 1892
  the Maryland Penitentiary, now the Metropolitan Transition Center, Baltimore, 1894
  central section of the Worcester County Courthouse, Snow Hill, Maryland

References

1829 births
1909 deaths
19th-century American architects
Fellows of the American Institute of Architects